Zon may refer to:
Zon (name)
 Zon (band), Canadian progressive rock band
 Zon Guitars, American manufacturer of bass guitars
 NOS (Portuguese media company), former names ZON Multimédia and ZON Optimus
 Zon, Burkina Faso, town in northern Burkina Faso
 Żoń, village in Poland
Uchat-Zon, village in Perm Krai, Russia

See also
Zoon (disambiguation)
Zohn
Zonn (disambiguation)
Zone (disambiguation)